Wadding is a surname, and may refer to

 Joey Wadding, Irish Gaelic footballer
 Luke Wadding (1588–1657), Irish Franciscan historian
 Michael Wadding (priest) (1591–1644), Irish Catholic missionary
 Michael Wadding (referee), Irish hurling referee
 Michael Wadding (television), British television producer
 Peter Wadding (c. 1581 – 1644), Irish jesuit

See also 
 Wadding (disambiguation)
 Waddington (surname)

English-language surnames